Ecuador competed at the 2020 Winter Youth Olympics in Lausanne, Switzerland from 9 to 22 January 2020. They competed with one athlete in one sport.

Ecuador made it Winter Youth Olympics debut.

Alpine skiing

Girls

See also
Ecuador at the 2020 Summer Olympics

References

2020 in Ecuadorian sport
Nations at the 2020 Winter Youth Olympics
Ecuador at the Youth Olympics